United Nations Security Council resolution 509, adopted unanimously on 6 June 1982, after recalling previous resolutions on the topic including 425 (1978) and 508 (1982), the Council expressed concern and demanded Israel unconditionally withdraw all its military forces from Lebanon back to its internationally recognised border.

Resolution 509 went on to demand all parties observe the ceasefire in Resolution 508, and to communicate the acceptance of the ceasefire to the Secretary-General within 24 hours.

See also
 1982 Lebanon War
 Blue Line
 Israeli–Lebanese conflict
 List of United Nations Security Council Resolutions 501 to 600 (1982–1987)

References
Text of the Resolution at undocs.org

External links
 

 0509
Israeli–Lebanese conflict
 0509
1982 in Israel
1982 in Lebanon
 0509
June 1982 events